Valery Fyodorovich Bykovsky (2 August 1934 – 27 March 2019) was a Soviet cosmonaut who flew on three space flights: Vostok 5, Soyuz 22, and Soyuz 31. He was also backup for Vostok 3 and Soyuz 37.

Early life and career 
Born in Pavlovsky Posad, Russia, on 2 August 1934, Bykovsky was the son of Fyodor Fyodorovich Bykovsky and Klavdia Ivanova. He had an older sister named Margarita born three years earlier. When he was four years old, World War II began, forcing the family to move to Kuybyshev, and later again to Syzran, before moving back to near Moscow. By the age of 14, Bykovsky wanted to attend naval school; however, his father was not a proponent of this idea and encouraged him to stay at his school. A few days later Bykovsky attended a lecture on the Soviet Air Force Club which inspired him to pursue his dream of becoming a pilot. He began flight theory lessons when he was 16 at the Moscow City Aviation Club.

Bykovsky graduated from aviation school aged 18 and enrolled in the Kachinsk Military Aviation Academy. He graduated from the academy at 21 years old and received the rank of lieutenant. At 25 he became a jet fighter pilot and later became a pilot and parachute instructor with over 72 jumps. Valery Bykovsky began his cosmonaut training in 1960 at the Zhukovsky Military Engineering Academy.

Cosmonaut career

Vostok programme 
At 26 years old he started his cosmonaut training at Zhukovsky Military Engineering academy. His first assignment was as the backup pilot of Vostok 3.

Bykovsky launched on the Vostok 5 mission on 14 June 1963. During the flight he conducted experiments, such as photographing the Earth's horizon and documenting the growth of peas. Two days into his flight, Valentina Tereshkova flew the Vostok 6 spacecraft within five kilometers of his spacecraft. He set a space endurance record when he spent five days in orbit aboard Vostok 5 in 1963 where his call-sign was "Hawk" (Russian: Ястреб). Although this flight duration has since been surpassed by crews of more than one person, it remains the endurance record for a solo spaceflight. During his orbit aboard Vostok 5, Bykovsky was also made a member of the communist party. He was promoted to colonel on 30 April 1966.

Soyuz programme 
Bykovsky was assigned to be the commander of the original Soyuz 2 mission, which was planned to be launched soon after Soyuz 1. Two of the three crewmen from Soyuz 2 were to conduct an extravehicular activity (EVA) and enter Soyuz 1. During the Soyuz 1 flight, many concurrent problems forced mission control to command an early reentry of the spacecraft. This also caused them to cancel the Soyuz 2 flight as no rendezvous could occur. On Soyuz 1, tube holding the main parachute was too rough, which created enough friction that the drogue parachute was unable to pull it out. The spacecraft struck the ground at approximately 93 miles per hour, killing Vladimir Komarov. As the Soyuz 2 capsule was made with the same specifications as Soyuz 1, if the mission had flown Bykovsky and his crew would have been killed.

He flew the Soyuz 22 mission with Vladimir Aksyonov. The mission launched on 15 September 1976. The capsule was originally a backup for the Apollo–Soyuz Test Project (ASTP). The main purpose of the mission was studying and practising Earth observation techniques.

He flew the Soyuz 31 mission to the Salyut 6 space station with the East German Sigmund Jähn. It was launched on 26 August 1978. They joined two other cosmonauts on the space station that had arrived on Soyuz 29. The four conducted biological experiments on themselves during their stay. Bykovsky and Jähn undocked from the station in the Soyuz 29 capsule on 3 September and landed back on Earth later that day.

Post-cosmonaut career

Much of his later career was devoted to promoting the Intercosmos programme amongst the world's Socialist nations. Due to his age, he was moved from active duty to the reserves in 1988. He became the director of the Centre of Soviet Science & Culture in East Berlin after the Soyuz 31 mission. He retired sometime in 1990.

Personal life
Bykovsky was a keen sportsman:

He was married to Valentina Mikhailovna Sukhova; they had two sons. In 1986, his first son died in an aviation incident. Valery Bykovsky died on 27 March 2019.

Honours and awards

 Twice Hero of the Soviet Union (22 June 1963 and 28 September 1976)
 Order of Lenin (1963, 1976, and 1978)
 Order of the Red Star (1961)
 Order of Friendship (12 April 2011)
 Order of the Red Banner of Labour (1976)
 Merited Master of Sports of the Soviet Union
 Pilot-Cosmonaut of the USSR (1963)
 Medal "For Development of the Virgin Lands" (1963)
 Hero of Socialist Labour (Bulgaria, 1963)
 Order of Georgi Dimitrov (Bulgaria, 1963)
 Hero of the German Democratic Republic (East Germany, 1978)
 Order of Karl Marx, twice (East Germany, 1976, 1978)
 Hero of Socialist Labour (Vietnam, 1963)
 Cross of Grunwald, 1st class (Poland, 1963)
 Star of the Republic of Indonesia, 2nd class (1963)
 Gold Medal. Tsiolkovsky Academy of Sciences
 FAI De La Vaulx Medal (1963)

Notes

References
 Gavrilin, Vyacheslav: Sportsmen of the Soviet Union
 "Rockets and people" – B. E. Chertok, M: "mechanical engineering", 1999.  
 "Testing of rocket and space technology - the business of my life" Events and facts - A.I. Ostashev, Korolyov, 2001.;
 "S. P. Korolev. Encyclopedia of life and creativity" – edited by C. A. Lopota, RSC Energia. S. P. Korolev, 2014 
 Official website of the city administration Baikonur - Honorary citizens of Baikonur

External links
 

1934 births
2019 deaths
1963 in spaceflight
People from Pavlovo-Posadsky District
Heroes of the Soviet Union
Recipients of the Order of the Cross of Grunwald, 1st class
Recipients of the Order of Georgi Dimitrov
Recipients of the Order of Lenin
Recipients of the Order of the Red Banner of Labour
Recipients of the Order of the Red Star
Recipients of the USSR State Prize
Soviet cosmonauts
Vostok program cosmonauts
Salyut program cosmonauts